(Latin: "To wonder at you"; subtitled "On Liberalism and Religious Indifferentism"), sometimes referred to as , is the first encyclical of Pope Gregory XVI and was issued in August 1832.  Addressed "To All Patriarchs, Primates, Archbishops, and Bishops of the Catholic World", it is general in scope.

Background
Felicité Robert de Lamennais, Charles Forbes René de Montalembert and Jean-Baptiste Henri Lacordaire started a newspaper,  ("The Future"). While the paper was a strong proponent of Ultramontanism, supporting the authority of the papacy in opposition to nationalist and secularist ideas, it also advocated an enlarged suffrage, separation of church and state, and universal freedom of conscience, instruction, assembly, and the press. They saw no conflict between Catholicism and liberal reform. The conservative French hierarchy regarded such views as dangerous nonsense, many considering an established church, a Catholic near-monopoly in education, and an anointed monarch as the bedrock of a Godly society. In November 1831, Lammennais and Montalembert traveled to Rome, seeking confirmation from Pope Gregory that views expressed in their newspaper were orthodox.

Although pressured by the French government and the French hierarchy, Pope Gregory XVI would have preferred not to make an official issue of the matter. After much opposition, the pair gained an audience on March 15, 1832, on condition that their political views should not be mentioned. The meeting was apparently cordial and uneventful. The leading conservative statesman Klemens von Metternich, whose Austrian troops guaranteed the stability of the Papal States, pressed for a condemnation.

The Pope's advisors were convinced that if he said nothing, it would condone Lamennais's opinions.  was issued the following August, criticizing Lamennais's views without mentioning him by name.

Content 
The encyclical voiced support for Christian freedom, upheld the ecclesiastical supremacy of the papacy and raised concerns over too-close alliances between clergy and government. It denounced those who advocated a married clergy: "We ask that you strive with all your might to justify and to defend the law of clerical celibacy as prescribed by the sacred canons, against which the arrows of the lascivious are directed from every side." He also denounced those who advocated divorce and secret societies that sought to overturn the legitimate governments of the Italian states.

The pope attacked religious indifferentism, defined as the opinion that one religion is as good as another, which he saw as the basis for the argument for liberty of conscience. He saw it as the state's duty to curtail false, immoral doctrines, and so denounced freedom to publish indiscriminately. Owen Chadwick explains Gregory's perspective: "To provide legally that writers or speakers shall be free to promote what is not true or to utter words that declare that racial prejudice, or paederasty, or pornography, or adultery, or murder not to be sins, cannot be what God demands of any State".

He stated, "Some are so carried away that they contentiously assert that the flock of errors arising from them is sufficiently compensated by the publication of some book which defends religion and truth. Every law condemns deliberately doing evil simply because there is some hope that good may result. Is there any sane man who would say poison ought to be distributed, sold publicly, stored, and even drunk because some antidote is available and those who use it may be snatched from death again and again?

The encyclical satisfied neither Lamennais's supporters nor his detractors.

See also  
 Clarification concerning status of Catholics becoming Freemasons
 Singulari Nos

References

External links

 Mirari vos, English translation from Papal Encyclicals Online.
Mirari vos, Latin original from Google Books.
Mirari vos, Latin original from Acta Gregorii Papae XVI: Pars prima canonica, volume I, pp 169–174.
Page 392.

Catholicism and Freemasonry
Papal encyclicals
Documents of Pope Gregory XVI
Religious pluralism